Adso may refer to:

 Adso of Montier-en-Der (920–992), abbot of the Benedictine monastery of Montier-en-Der Abbey in France
 Adso of Melk, a character in The Name of the Rose
 ADSO (Application Development System Online), a tool used to expedite the writing and testing of modular applications using IDMS databases